The National Haitian Student Alliance (NHSA) is a non-profit organization, which serves as an umbrella organization to all Haitian student groups and affiliated clubs in the United States and Canada's community colleges, universities, and all forms of higher learning institutions.  The purpose of NHSA is to unite Haitian youth nationwide and to provide educational/leadership opportunities for students through scholarships, project involvement, trainings, and workshops.

History of National Haitian Student Conference 

Since 1998, the National Haitian Student Conference (NHSC) has grown from an event solely of 100 participants from New York City area colleges, to one that is attended by over 1,000 students from universities nationwide. Throughout its evolution, NHSC has always been fertile ground on which Haitians, African-Americans, Hispanics, Africans, West Indians and various ethnic groups come together to discuss issues that relate to the diversity of Haitian culture and heritage. The Attendees are immersed in pertinent information, inspired by world-renowned speakers and are encouraged to volunteer and become active in their local communities.

Past participants of the conference have included: Wyclef Jean, Grammy Award winning producer, singer-songwriter; Edwidge Danticat, acclaimed Haitian writer whose literature has been featured in Oprah's Book Club; Marie St. Fleur, the first Haitian State Representative in Massachusetts; Judge Sybil Elias, the first Haitian judge in New Jersey; Ron Daniels, motivational speaker and Senator Kwami Raoul, the first Haitian-American Senator of Illinois.

Conferences and themes 
2010 Atlanta, Georgia: "Rising in solidarity to fulfill the dreams of our ancestors."
2009 Chicago, Illinois: "Discovering DuSable: Past, Present, and Beyond Chicago." (In attendance)
2008 University of Florida: “Koze Kache: The Diary of Haiti”
2007 Pennsylvania State University: "La Renaissance D'Haiti: Kote-n Sorti, Kote Nou Ye, Kote-n Pwale"
2006 New York University: “Kraze Barikad: Pale Sa Yo Pa Vle”
2005 Florida Atlantic University: “Rise of the Phoenix”
2004 Rutgers University: “A Time for Change: Two Hundred Years of Sacrifice”
2003 University of Massachusetts: “Blood, Sweat, and Tears”
2002 Georgetown University: “Haiti Now”
2001 University of Pennsylvania: “The Arts of Haiti”
2000 New York University: “L’Essence D’Haiti, The Essence of Haiti”
1999 Columbia University: “L’Union Fait La Force, The Unity Creates Force”
1998 Columbia University: “Ayiti Cherie Mwen: Holding on to Haiti”

Active programs

Ti Frem Ti Sem

Ti Frem Ti Sem is a peer-mentoring program that fosters cultural education, builds unity among community members, provides role models as well as creates recreational activities for high school and college students.  It also facilitates leadership, guidance, networking, and self-esteem for Haitian College and High School Students. In this program Haitian professionals mentor Haitian college students, while those same college students do the same for Haitian high school students.

Haitian American Book Club

The book club's main goals are to increase literacy among Haitian youths and to provide an outlet for students to gain analytical skills by holding regular book discussions with book authors.  The Haitian American Book club chooses a book once a month to read and analyze.  The books chosen are normally by Haitian American writers or have some form of relevance to students in general.

Haiti Revived Program

The Haiti Revived program seeks to raise money for Haiti as well as organizing trips for students to go to Haiti to aid in the rebuilding process of selected areas of the country.

Wyclef Jean Scholarship Program

This program awards educational scholarships specifically to students of Haitian descent who are historically underserved.

Current list of state associations 
New Jersey Haitian Student Association
United Haitian Students of Florida
Massachusetts Haitian Student Association
Pennsylvania Haitian Student Association
New York Haitian Student Association

External links
Official website

Student organizations in the United States
Haitian American
Haitian Canadian